World history may refer to:

 Human history, the history of human beings
 History of Earth, the history of planet Earth
 World history (field), a field of historical study that takes a global perspective
 World History (album), a 1998 album by Christian rock band Mad at the World
 Universal history, a work of historiography that covers all of world history

See also
 Timelines of world history
 History of the world (disambiguation)